VP-29 was a Patrol Squadron of the U.S. Navy. The squadron was established as Patrol Squadron 911 (VP-911) on 6 July 1946, redesignated Medium Patrol Squadron (Landplane) 61 (VP-ML-61) on 15 November 1946, redesignated Patrol Squadron 812 (VP-812) in February 1950, redesignated Patrol Squadron 29 (VP-29) on 27 August 1952 and disestablished on 1 November 1955. It was the second squadron to be designated VP-29, the first VP-29 was disestablished on 18 January 1950.

Operational history
6 July 1946: VP-911 was established at NAS Minneapolis, Minnesota, as a reserve training squadron, flying PV-2 Harpoons and PBY-5A/6A Catalinas. The squadron aircraft allowance was nine aircraft, but seldom exceeded more than seven operational aircraft.
20 July 1950: The squadron was called to active duty along with 13 other Reserve squadrons as a result of the outbreak of the Korean War on 25 June 1950. The squadron remained at NAS Minneapolis until orders were received to transfer to a new home port at NAS Whidbey Island, Washington.
31 July – October 1950: VP-812 settled into its new home port at NAS Whidbey Island and began training for transition to the new P2V-2 Neptune patrol bomber. By October 1950 the squadron had received nine new aircraft from the factory.
8 November 1950: VP-812 deployed on its first operational assignment since its recall to active duty, arriving at NAS Kodiak, Alaska, with nine P2V-2s.
27 September 1952: The squadron deployed to NAS Atsugi, Japan, providing patrol sector coverage in the Sea of Japan and along the coasts of Korea in support of UN forces.
January – April 1953: The squadron was classified under “Patrol Squadrons, Mining,” reflecting a specialty practiced by only three other Pacific Fleet squadrons (VPs 4, 9 and 19).
5 April 1953: The squadron returned to NAS Whidbey Island after completing over 500 combat missions in Korea during a six-month deployment, averaging 40 missions per crew, 500 hours per crewman.
1 November 1955: VP-29 was disestablished at NAS Whidbey Island, with assets and personnel utilized to form Heavy Attack Squadron 2 (VAH-2).

Aircraft assignments
The squadron was assigned the following aircraft, effective on the dates shown:
 PV-2 - July 1946
 PBY-5A/6A July 1946
 P2V-2 - October 1950
 P2V-5 - June 1951
 P2V-6 - September 1952
 P2V-7 - May 1955

Home port assignments
The squadron was assigned to these home ports, effective on the dates shown:
 NAS Minneapolis, Minnesota - 6 July 1946
 NAS Whidbey Island, Washington - 27 August 1950

See also

 Maritime patrol aircraft
 List of inactive United States Navy aircraft squadrons
 List of United States Navy aircraft squadrons
 List of squadrons in the Dictionary of American Naval Aviation Squadrons
 History of the United States Navy

References

Patrol squadrons of the United States Navy
Wikipedia articles incorporating text from the Dictionary of American Naval Aviation Squadrons